North Stelton is an unincorporated community located within Piscataway Township in Middlesex County, New Jersey, United States.

See also
 Stelton, New Jersey

References

Piscataway, New Jersey
Unincorporated communities in Middlesex County, New Jersey
Unincorporated communities in New Jersey